Knock on Wood – The Best of Amii Stewart is a compilation album of recordings by Amii Stewart released in 1996. The compilation mainly covers material from her early disco career and albums Knock On Wood and Paradise Bird, both from 1979. This compilation was one of the first to use the original versions of Amii Stewart's hits instead of the 1985 remixes from album The Hits, with one exception - the duet "My Guy"/"My Girl" which originally was recorded with Johnny Bristol. Knock on Wood - The Best of Amii Stewart also contains two tracks from 1981's Images/I'm Gonna Get Your Love and finishes with 1985's European hit single "Friends".

Track listing
"Knock on Wood" (original album version)  - 6:13
"You Really Touched My Heart"   - 4:29
"Light My Fire" / "137 Disco Heaven" (original album version) - 8:26
"Bring It on Back to Me"  - 3:56
"My Guy, My Girl" (1985 version feat. Deon Estus) - 4:31
"Get Your Love Back" - 3:56
"The Letter" (original album version) - 6:58
"Paradise Bird" (original album version) - 6:35
"Jealousy" (original album version) - 6:09
"Right Place, Wrong Time"  - 5:07
"Step Into the Love Line" - 5:23
"Why'd You Have to Be So Sexy" (extended version) - 5:20
"Where Did Our Love Go" (album version)  - 4:26
"Friends" (long version) - 6:29

Personnel
 Amii Stewart - vocals
 Barry Leng - backing vocals, guitar
 Charles Angins  - backing vocals
 Gerry Morris  - backing vocals
 Jimmy Chambers  - backing vocals
 Tony Jackson   - backing vocals
 Gerry Morris - bass guitar
 Adrian Shepard - drums
 Alan Murphy - guitar
 Ian Hughes - keyboards
 Ken Freeman - keyboards
 Pete Amesen - keyboards
 Simon May - keyboards
 Glyn Thomas - percussion
 Mike Francis - keyboards, backing vocals (track 14)

Production
 Producer - Barry Leng (tracks 1 to 11)
 Producer - Narada Michael Walden (tracks 12 & 13)
 Producer - Paul Micioni (track 14)

References

Amii Stewart albums
albums produced by Narada Michael Walden
2005 compilation albums
Disco compilation albums